Pyrenomonadales is an order of Cryptophyta.

References

Cryptomonads
Bikont orders